Tol-e Khandaq, also known as Tol-e Jandaq, may refer to:
 Tol-e Khandaq-e Olya
 Tol-e Khandaq-e Sofla